Paul Musser (June 24, 1889 – July 7, 1973) was a pitcher in Major League Baseball who played for the Washington Senators and Boston Red Sox. A native of Millheim, Pennsylvania, he attended Susquehanna University.

In a two-season career, Musser posted a 0–2 record with a 3.35 ERA in 12 appearances, including six starts, one complete game, two saves, 24 strikeouts, 24 walks, and  innings of work.

Musser died at the age of 84 in State College, Pennsylvania.

External links
Baseball Reference
Retrosheet

Boston Red Sox players
Washington Senators (1901–1960) players
Major League Baseball pitchers
Baseball players from Pennsylvania
People from Centre County, Pennsylvania
1889 births
1973 deaths
Altoona Mountaineers players
Canton Deubers players
Los Angeles Angels (minor league) players
Atlanta Crackers players
Des Moines Boosters players
Susquehanna River Hawks baseball players
Wichita Jobbers players
Wichita Witches players
Wichita Izzies players
Wichita Falls Spudders players